Cryphonectriaceae is a family of fungi in the order Diaporthales.

Genera
Amphilogia
Aurantiosacculus
Aurapex
Aurifilum
Celoporthe
Chrysofolia
Chrysoporthe
Cryphonectria
Corticimorbus
Cryptometrion
Endothia
Endothiella
Foliocryphia
Holocryphia
Latruncellus
Microthia
Prosopidicola
Rostraureum
Ursicollum

References

External links 

Fungal plant pathogens and diseases
Diaporthales